List of characters appearing in Disney's Descendants franchise.

Introduced in Descendants film series

Introduced in Descendants

Descendants
Mal (played by Dove Cameron) is the daughter of Maleficent (Sleeping Beauty) and Hades (Hercules), the latter left when she was a baby. Mal reunites with Hades in Descendants 3. During Descendants, she becomes Ben's girlfriend, and after she's engaged to him in Descendants 3, Mal becomes the queen of both Auradon and the Isle of the Lost. She is the best friends with  Evie. She wears a purple and green jacket and purple pants She  has purple hair and green eyes In Descendants 3 she wears a  purple dress with a green dragon painted on it 
Evie (played by Sofia Carson) is the daughter of the Evil Queen (Snow White and the Seven Dwarfs). She is very good at cooking, sewing, making clothes, and fashion design. She is best friends with Mal and owns her own fashion company Evie's Four Hearts.
Jay (played by Booboo Stewart) is the son of Jafar (Aladdin). He used to steal for his father's pawn shop. Now in Auradon, he is the Captain of the Tourney team.
Carlos De Vil (played by Cameron Boyce) is the son of Cruella de Vil (101 Dalmatians). Carlos is jumpy and anxious, but with the skills of a true tech prodigy and in love with Jane.
Ben (played by Mitchell Hope) is the son of King Beast and Queen Belle (Beauty and the Beast), and the current king of Auradon. In Descendants 2, Ben along with Evie, Carlos and Jay ventures to the Isle of the Lost in hopes to find Mal and bring her back to Auradon, but to do that, Ben has to go undercover as a VK so he can infiltrate the isle without being detected. In Descendants 3, Ben proposes to Mal.
Jane (played by Brenna D'Amico) is the daughter of Fairy Godmother (Cinderella). Since Descendants 2, she is Carlos' girlfriend. She is very sweet, creative, and jumpy.
Doug (played by Zachary Gibson) is the son of the dwarf Dopey (Snow White and the Seven Dwarfs), and a member of the school musical band. He becomes Evie's boyfriend.
Audrey (played by Sarah Jeffery) is the daughter of Princess Aurora and Prince Philip (Sleeping Beauty) who is shown to be opposed to the idea of the villain kids being welcomed to Auradon. Though she didn't make an appearance on Descendants 2, she is mentioned various times, especially by Chad Charming. In Descendants, she was mean to all the villain-kids, but especially Mal. In Descendants 3, she steals the crown and the scepter and turns evil but is later defeated. Later on, Audrey apologizes to Mal and Ben for what she had done and she decided to make peace with the villain kids.
Lonnie (portrayed by Dianne Doan) is the daughter of Mulan and Li Shang (Mulan). Lonnie has an older brother named Li'l Shang who was introduced in the books.
Chad (portrayed by Jedidiah Goodacre) is the son of Cinderella and Prince Charming (Cinderella). Like Audrey, in the first film, he is distrusting of the VKs. After Queen Leah angrily tells Mal about her loss of time with Aurora due to Maleficent, Chad takes the opportunity to berate the VKs, as a result, Jay pushes him and Evie sprays him unconscious with a tranquilizer. In Descendants 2, Chad is shown a lot playing with the 3D printer in Carlos's room. He is also the ex-boyfriend of Princess Audrey. In  Descendants 3, he decided to become Audrey’s sidekick, however Audrey locks him in a closet at her cottage. He is later discovered by Ben and the VKs, and he runs away frightened. He has a sister named Chloe, to be introduced in Descendants: The Pocketwatch.

Disney classic characters
King Beast (portrayed by Dan Payne), from Beauty and the Beast, is the former king of Auradon, Queen Belle's husband, and Ben's father.
Queen Belle (portrayed by Keegan Connor Tracy), from Beauty and the Beast, is the former queen of Auradon, King Beast's wife, and Ben's mother.
Fairy Godmother (portrayed by Melanie Paxson), from Cinderella, is the principal of Auradon Academy, and Jane's mother.
Maleficent (portrayed by Kristin Chenoweth), from Sleeping Beauty, is Mal's mother, and the queen of the Isle of the Lost until she was defeated in Descendants.
Evil Queen (portrayed by Kathy Najimy), from Snow White and the Seven Dwarfs, is Evie's mother.
Cruella De Vil (portrayed by Wendy Raquel Robinson), from 101 Dalmatians, is Carlos' mother.
Jafar (portrayed by Maz Jobrani), from Aladdin, is Jay's father.
Snow White (portrayed by Stephanie Bennett), from Snow White and the Seven Dwarfs, is the news reporter on Auradon television.

Other characters
Dude (voiced by Bobby Moynihan) is a dog that was taken in by the Auradon Academy, and becomes Carlos's pet and best friend. Since Descendants 2, because of a spell he has the ability to speak.
Coach Jenkins (portrayed by Reese Alexander) is the Tourney coach at the Auradon Academy. He teaches Jay to work on a team.

Introduced in Descendants 2

Descendants
Uma (portrayed by China Anne McClain) is the daughter of Ursula (The Little Mermaid), and the leader of the pirates on the Isle. After Maleficent become a lizard in Auradon, Uma become the self -proclaim leader of the Isle of the Lost. She and Mal were archenemys. Mal's nickname for Uma was "Shrimpy". In Descendants 3, Mal and Uma put their differences aside in order to save Auradon. The two girls even become friends before the end of the third movie.
Harry Hook (portrayed by Thomas Doherty) is the middle child of Captain Hook (Peter Pan). He is Uma's first mate and best friend.
Gil (portrayed by Dylan Playfair) is the youngest son of Gaston (Beauty and the Beast). He is part of Uma's crew. In Descendants 3, Gil bonds with Jay.
Dizzy Tremaine (portrayed by Anna Cathcart) is the daughter of Drizella Tremaine (Cinderella), and works for her grandmother Lady Tremaine at "Curl Up & Dye" on Isle of the Lost. In Descendants 3, she was chosen by Evie to come to Auradon.

Disney classic characters
Lumière (portrayed by Jan Bos), from Beauty and the Beast, is the butler of Auradon's royal family.
Ursula (voice by Whoopi Goldberg), from The Little Mermaid, is Uma's mother. She does not physically appear, and is only heard screaming when her tentacle pokes out of the kitchen door at her restaurant.

Introduced in Descendants 3

Descendants
Celia Facilier (portrayed by Jadah Marie) is the youngest daughter of Dr. Facilier (The Princess and the Frog). She tells fortunes and runs errands for Hades. She is chosen by Mal to go to Auradon.
Squeaky and Squirmy (portrayed by Christian Convery and Luke Roessler) are two twin brothers, and the sons of Mr. Smee (Peter Pan). They were both chosen by Carlos and Jay to come to Auradon.

Disney classic characters
Hades (portrayed by Cheyenne Jackson), from Hercules, is the former ruler of the Underworld, and Mal's father.
Mr. Smee (portrayed by Faustino Di Bauda), from Peter Pan, is the father of Squeaky and Squirmy.
 Dr. Facilier (portrayed by Jamal Sims), from The Princess and the Frog, is a former New Orleans voodoo practitioner, and Celia's father.

Introduced in Descendants: The Pocketwatch
Red (portrayed by Kylie Cantrall) is the daughter of the Queen of Hearts (Alice in Wonderland).
Chloe (portrayed by Malia Baker) is the daughter of Cinderella and Prince Charming (Cinderella). She is the sister of Chad.
Maddox (portrayed by Leonardo Nam) is the son of the Mad Hatter.
Zellie (portrayed by Sam Morelos) is the daughter of Rapunzel.
Morgie (portrayed by Peder Lindell) is the son of Morgana le Fay.
Ulyana (portrayed by Dara Reneé) is the sister of Ursula (The Little Mermaid). She is the aunt of Uma.

Introduced in Descendants: Wicked World animated series
Freddie Facilier (voiced by China Anne McClain in Season 1, Lauryn McClain in Season 2) is the eldest daughter of Dr. Facilier (The Princess and the Frog) and the older sister of Celia.
Jordan (voiced by Ursula Taherian) is the daughter of the Genie (Aladdin). She has the powers of a genie and possesses the magic lamp.
Ally (voiced by Jennifer Veal) is the daughter of Alice (Alice in Wonderland). Her mother owns a tea shop.
CJ Hook (voiced by Myrna Velasco) is the youngest child of Captain Hook (Peter Pan). She appears as the antagonist of Wicked World and is mentioned in "Rise of the Isle of the Lost". She is Harriet and Harry's younger sister.
Zevon (voiced by Bradley Steven Perry) is the son of Yzma (The Emperor's New Groove), and the brother of Yzla. He is the main antagonist in the second season of Wicked World.
Ruby is the daughter of Rapunzel and Flynn Rider (Tangled). Only her hair is seen, which is as long as her mother's. She also has a sister named Anxelin, who was introduced in Descendants: School of Secrets.

Introduced in Descendants: School of Secrets shorts
Anxelin is the daughter of Rapunzel and Flynn Rider (Tangled), and the sister of Ruby.
Sleepy Jr. is the son of Sleepy (Snow White and the Seven Dwarfs).
Bashful Jr. is the son of Bashful (Snow White and the Seven Dwarfs).

Introduced in Isle of the Lost book series

Introduced in Isle of the Lost

Descendants
Diego De Vil is the cousin of Carlos and the nephew of Cruella De Vil (101 Dalmatians).
Harold Badun is the child of Horace (101 Dalmatians), and is one of Carlos' henchmen.
Jason Badun is the child of Jasper (101 Dalmatians), and is one of Carlos' henchmen.
Anthony Tremaine is the son of Anastasia Tremaine and grandson of Lady Tremaine (Cinderella). Cousin of Dizzy.
Ginny Gothel is the daughter of Mother Gothel (Tangled). She also hates Mal.
Claudine Frollo is the daughter of Claude Frollo (The Hunchback of Notre Dame).
Harriet Hook is the eldest child of Captain Hook (Peter Pan). She appears in the books "Isle of The Lost" and "Rise of the Isle of the Lost".
Yzla is the daughter of Yzma (The Emperor's New Groove), and the sister of Zevon.
Aziz is the son of Aladdin and Jasmine (Aladdin).
Beelzebub is Carlos' pet cat, and the daughter of Lucifer (Cinderella).

Disney classic characters
Dr. Facilier (portrayed by Jamal Sims), from The Princess and the Frog, is Freddie and Celia's father. In the book Isle of the Lost, he appears as the principal and one of the teachers at the school of the Isle of the Lost. In the films, he makes an appearance in Descendants 3.
Lady Tremaine (portrayed by Linda Ko), from Cinderella, is Dizzy's grandmother. In the book Isle of the Lost, she appears as one of the teachers at the school of the Isle of the Lost. In Descendants 2, she can only be heard yelling at her granddaughter from the top of her hair salon. In Descendants 3, she appears saying goodbye to her granddaughter when she leaves the Isle.
Mother Gothel, from Tangled, appears as one of the teachers at the school of the Isle of the Lost. She is Ginny's mother.
Yen Sid, from Fantasia, is a sorcerer who was sent to the Isle of the Lost by the King Beast to apply a little kindness to the children of villains, serving as a science teacher at school. In Return to the Isle of the Lost, he founds a secret club joined by the children of villains who want to change just like Mal and her friends.

Introduced in Return to the Isle of the Lost
Mad Maddy is the granddaughter of Madam Mim (The Sword in the Stone). She and Mal were best friends growing up.
Hadie is the son of Hades and Mal's half-brother (Hercules). 
Artie is the son of King Arthur (The Sword in the Stone).
Pin is the son of Pinocchio (Pinocchio).
Gordon is the son of Grumpy (Snow White and the Seven Dwarfs).
Herkie is the son of Hercules (Hercules).
Eddie is the son of Edgar Balthazar (The Aristocats). 
Tiger Peony is the daughter of Tiger Lily (Peter Pan). 
Hermie Bing is the daughter of The Ringmaster (Dumbo).
Big Murph is the son of one of the pirates of Captain Hook's crew (Peter Pan). Due to his name, he may be the son of Black Muprhy.

Introduced in Rise of the Isle of the Lost
Sophie is the intern of Yen Sid. 
Arabella is the niece of Ariel and the daughter of one of Ariel's sisters (The Little Mermaid).
Li'l Shang is the son of Mulan and Li Shang (Mulan). Older brother of Lonnie.

Introduced in Escape from the Isle of the Lost
Bobby Hood is the son of Robin Hood (Robin Hood).
Ariana Rose is the snooty cousin of Audrey.

Introduced in School of Secrets book series
Opal is the daughter of Mama Odie (The Princess and the Frog). 
The Tweedledum and Tweedledee cousins are the sons of Tweedledum and Tweedledee (Alice in Wonderland).
Yi-min is the daughter of Yao (Mulan).
Carina Potts is the daughter of Mrs. Potts (Beauty and the Beast). She is Chip's sister.

References

Descendants
Descendants (franchise)